

H

References

Lists of words